HD may refer to:

Business 
 H-D or Harley-Davidson, a motorcycle manufacturer
 The Home Depot, NYSE stock symbol: HD

Chemistry 
 Hydrogen deuteride, a diatomic compound of hydrogen and deuterium
 Mustard gas

Codes
 Air Do, formerly Hokkaido International Airlines, IATA designator
 HD postcode area, covering Huddersfield, Brighouse and Holmfirth in England, UK
 Heidelberg's vehicle registration plate code
 Hunedoara County  (Romania)'s ISO 3166 code

Medicine 
 Hansen's disease or leprosy
 Hirschsprung's disease, a disorder of the abdomen
 Huntington's disease, a genetic disorder affecting the central nervous system
 HD (gene) or huntingtin, the IT15 gene, which codes for the huntingtin protein

People 
 H.D. or Hilda Doolittle (1886–1961), American poet and novelist
 HD (commentator) or HDStarcraft, former e-sports commentator

Other uses 
 Helsingborgs Dagblad, a Swedish newspaper
 Henry Draper Catalogue, an astronomical catalogue often used to designate stars
 Hurter and Driffield Numbers or H&D, an old scale for measuring film speed

See also 
 HD Photo, an image format
 HD Radio, an abbreviation from the term hybrid digital/analog radio
 HD Voice, or wideband audio
 Heavy Duty (disambiguation)
 High Density, a diskette density
 High-definition television (HDTV), a resolution that is substantially higher than that of standard-definition television
 720p (HD), a progressive HDTV signal format with 720 horizontal lines/1280 columns and an aspect ratio (AR) of 16:9
 High-definition video, video of higher resolution and quality than standard-definition
 Intel High Definition Audio, a specification for the audio sub-system of personal computers